The Glenville State Pioneers are the athletic teams that represent Glenville State University, located in Glenville, West Virginia, in NCAA Division II intercollegiate sports. The Pioneers compete as members of the Mountain East Conference for all 12 varsity sports.

Varsity teams

List of teams

Men's sports (6)
 Baseball
 Basketball
 Cross Country
 Football
 Golf
 Track and field

Women's sports (6)
 Basketball
 Cross Country
 Soccer
 Softball
 Track and field
 Volleyball

National championships

Team

References

External links